Thomas Edward Bostock (also known as T.E. Bostock) was Geelong's mayor from 1905 to 1908 and served on Council from 1898 to 1912. He also established the Barwon Heads Golf Club early in the century.

References
 http://birrell.1hwy.com/pg000002.htm
 http://archiver.rootsweb.com/th/read/AUS-VIC-WESTERN-DISTRICT/2003-01/1042712456
 http://www.zades.com.au/geelong/gdnamsbb.htm

Mayors of Geelong
Year of death missing
Year of birth missing